This article is about territorial disputes of the People's Republic of China (PRC). A territorial dispute is a disagreement over the possession or control of land between two or more political entities. Many of these territorial disputes are almost identical to the Republic of China (ROC) government based in Taipei, also known as Taiwan, has with other countries. Therefore, many of the subsequent resolved disputes made by the PRC after 1949 with other governments may not be recognised by the ROC.

Current disputes

Bhutan
Bhutan has long had strong cultural, historical, religious and economic connections to Tibet. Bhutan's border with Tibet has never been officially recognized, much less demarcated. The Republic of China based in Taiwan officially maintains a territorial claim on parts of Bhutan to this day. The territorial claim was maintained by the People's Republic of China after the Chinese Communist Party took control of mainland China in the Chinese Civil War.

The 1959 Tibetan Rebellion and the 14th Dalai Lama's arrival in neighbouring India made the security of Bhutan's border with China a necessity for Bhutan. An estimated 6,000 Tibetans fled to Bhutan and were granted asylum, although Bhutan subsequently closed its border to China, fearing more refugees to come. In July 1959, along with the occupation of Tibet, the Chinese People's Liberation Army occupied several Bhutanese exclaves in western Tibet which were under Bhutanese administration for more than 300 years and had been given to Bhutan by Ngawang Namgyal in the 17th century. These included Darchen, Labrang Monastery, Gartok and several smaller monasteries and villages near Mount Kailas.

In 1983, the Chinese Foreign Minister Wu Xueqian and Bhutanese Foreign Minister Dawa Tsering held talks on establishing bilateral relations in New York. In 1984, China and Bhutan began annual, direct talks over the border dispute. In 1998, China and Bhutan signed a bilateral agreement for maintaining peace on the border. In the agreement, China affirmed its respect for Bhutan's sovereignty and territorial integrity and both sides sought to build ties based on the Five Principles of Peaceful Co-existence. However, China's building of roads on what Bhutan asserts to be Bhutanese territory, allegedly in violation of the 1998 agreement, has provoked tensions. In 2002, however, China presented what it claimed to be 'evidence', asserting its ownership of disputed tracts of land; after negotiations, an interim agreement was reached.

On 11 August 2016 Bhutan Foreign Minister Damcho Dorji visited Beijing, capital of China, for the 24th round of boundary talks with Chinese Vice President Li Yuanchao. Both sides made comments to show their readiness to strengthen co-operations in various fields and hope of settling the boundary issues.

India
China has various border disputes with India; India claims Aksai Chin, which is administrated by China. During the 1950s, the People's Republic of China built a 1,200 km (750 mi) road connecting Xinjiang and western Tibet, of which 179 km (112 mi) ran south of the Johnson Line through the Aksai Chin region claimed by India. Aksai Chin was easily accessible to the Chinese, but was more difficult for the Indians on the other side of the Karakorams to reach. The Indians did not learn of the existence of the road until 1957, which was confirmed when the road was shown in Chinese maps published in 1958. China consolidated its control of Aksai Chin after the Sino-Indian War of 1962.

The Depsang Plains are located on the border of the Indian union territory of Ladakh and the disputed zone of Aksai Chin. The Chinese Army occupied most of the plains during its 1962 war with India, while India controls the western portion of the plains. The dispute remains unresolved.

Arunachal Pradesh is a state of India created on 20 January 1972, located in the far northeast. It borders the states of Assam and Nagaland to the south, and shares international borders with Burma in the east, Bhutan in the west, and China in the north. The majority of the territory is claimed by China, by whom it is called South Tibet. The northern border of Arunachal Pradesh reflects the McMahon Line, a line demarcated by the 1914 Simla Convention between the United Kingdom and the Tibetan government. The Simla Convention was never accepted by the Chinese government, and it was also considered invalid by Tibetans due to unmet conditions specified in the treaty. The boundary was not broadly enforced by the Indian government until 1950. Currently, this territory is administered by India.

Japan
China and Japan have a territorial dispute over a group of uninhabited islands known as the Senkaku Islands in Japan, the Diaoyu Islands in the People's Republic of China (PRC), and Tiaoyutai Islands in the Republic of China (ROC or Taiwan). Aside from a 1945 to 1972 period of administration by the United States as part of the Ryukyu Islands, the archipelago has been controlled by Japan since 1895. According to Lee Seokwoo, the People's Republic of China (PRC) started taking up the question of sovereignty over the islands in the latter half of 1970 when evidence relating to the existence of oil reserves surfaced. The ROC also claims the islands. The territory is close to key shipping lanes and rich fishing grounds, and there may be oil reserves in the area.

Japan argues that it surveyed the islands in the late 19th century and found them to be terra nullius (Latin: land belonging to no one); subsequently, China acquiesced to Japanese sovereignty until the 1970s. The PRC and the ROC argue that documentary evidence prior to the First Sino-Japanese War indicates Chinese possession and that the territory is accordingly a Japanese seizure that should be returned as the rest of Imperial Japan's conquests were returned in 1945.

The islands are included within the Treaty of Mutual Cooperation and Security between the United States and Japan, meaning that a defense of the islands by Japan would require the United States to come to Japan's aid.

In September 2012, the Japanese government purchased three of the disputed islands from their private owner, prompting large-scale protests in China. As of early February 2013, the situation has been regarded as "the most serious for Sino-Japanese relations in the post-war period in terms of the risk of militarised conflict."

Taiwan
The PRC claims entire Taiwan's sovereignty, Taiwan Province, as well as mainland-nearby islands of Kinmen and Matsu Islands. However, despite the diplomatic stalemate between the governments in Beijing and Taipei, both governments agree on many of the same territorial disputes, namely the Senkaku Islands and the 9-dash line, or the eleven-dash line in the case of the ROC.

Vietnam
China and Vietnam has territory dispute over Paracel Islands, which are administered and occupied by the People's Republic, but claimed by Vietnam.

South China Sea
The maritime area in South China Sea, which the PRC and ROC claimed sovereignty on area surrounding shoals and islands in the Sea, as well as historical right over the area in nine-dash line.

Resolved disputes
China was generally generous in resolving disputes with its southwest neighbors. According to academic Swaran Singh, China's generosity was likely motivated by the security concern of reducing foreign support for disgruntled groups within China's southwest border.

In Central Asia, the newly-independent following the dissolution of the Soviet Union inherited the border disagreements with China, which had themselves been inherited from czarist Russia and the Qing dynasty. China negotiated bilaterally to resolve its borders with these conflicts. Ultimately, China obtained Central Asian territory significantly less than what it had originally claimed. Resolution of these disputes on territorial terms generally favorable to the Central Asian countries created goodwill for China, avoided conflict, and also resulted in recognition that the czarist era borders were imposed unjustly on China.

Kazakhstan
After the dissolution of the Soviet Union Kazakhstan became an independent country, and around 2,420 square kilometers of land was disputed with China. A border treaty between the two nations was signed in Almaty on April 26, 1994, and ratified by the Kazakh president on June 15, 1995. China received around 22% of the total disputed territory, and Kazakhstan received the remaining 78%.

Kyrgyzstan
When Kyrgyzstan became independent in 1991 after the Soviet Union's dissolution, it inherited a section of the USSR-China frontier. The two countries delimited their border in 1996. Formal demarcation was hampered by opposition to the border treaty by elements of the Kyrgyz opposition, centred on Azimbek Beknazarov, as part of a wider movement against then-President Askar Akayev culminating in the Tulip Revolution. The border agreement was finalised in 2009, with China giving up part of the Khan Tengri Peak while Kyrgyzstan ceded the Uzengi-Kush, a mountainous area located south of the Issyk Kul region.

Laos
Laos obtained a partial independence from France in 1949, around the time when Mao Zedong established the People's Republic of China after defeating Chiang Kai Shek's nationalist government in the Chinese Civil War. Consequently, China's adaptation of Stalinist principles in the form of Maoism influenced Laotian politics, fuelling demands for total independence from France, which was granted in 1953. The boundary then became one between two sovereign independent states. The border was re-surveyed and demarcated in April 1992.

Mongolia
The People's Republic of China established diplomatic relations with Mongolia on October 16, 1949 and both nations signed a border treaty in 1962. With the Sino-Soviet split, Mongolia aligned itself with the Soviet Union and asked for the deployment of Soviet forces, leading to security concerns in China. As a result, bilateral ties remained tense until 1984, when a high-level Chinese delegation visited Mongolia and both nations began to survey and demarcate their borders. Mongolian General Secretary Jambyn Batmönkh, during a meeting with President Kim Il sung while on a state visit to Pyongyang in November 1986 states that "renewing the development of Sino-Mongolian relations is important for our two countries’ people's common interest". In 1986, a series of agreements to bolster trade and establish transport and air links was signed.

Myanmar
The boundary area between China and Burma (Myanmar) is inhabited by non-Han and non-Bamar peoples, and has been traditionally kept as a buffer region between the various Chinese and Burmese empires. During the 19th century the British, based in India, began occupying Myanmar (then referred to as Burma), gradually incorporating it into British India. Their advance close to lands traditionally claimed by China pushed the two sides into negotiating a boundary treaty in 1894, which covered the southern half of the boundary as far north as the vicinity of Myitkyina, exclusive of the Wa States. Sections of this border were demarcated and marked on the ground from 1897 to 1900. In 1941 a border running through the Wa States area was agreed upon following on-the-ground surveys conducted in the 1930s, though no agreement on the northern stretch was reached, with China claiming much of what is now northern Myanmar. Meanwhile, Burma was separated from India and became a separate colony in 1937, gaining full independence in 1948.

During the Second World War the Burma Road was constructed across the border as an Allied supply line to Chinese forces fighting Japan. Additionally in 1941, following Japan's invasion of Burma, parts of Burma were ceded to Siam as the Saharat Thai Doem territory, thereby giving China a common border with Thailand, however these areas were returned to Burma in 1946 following Japan's defeat.

Discussions between Burma and China over the border began in 1954, with China keen to control the area more effectively as it was being used as a base by Kuomintang troops. On 28 January 1960 a treaty was signed which delimited most of the border, which was later completed with a full delimitation treaty signed on 1 October 1960, with both sides ceding small areas along the border. The two sides then demarcated the border on the ground in the following year.

Since then relations between the two states have remained largely cordial, though the border region has at times been volatile owing to the ongoing insurgencies in Myanmar's Kachin and Shan states. In recent years several towns along the border, such as Mong La, Ruili and Muse, have become centres of gambling, prostitution and drug smuggling.

Nepal
Several treaties were negotiated between Nepal and Tibet (Qing China) in the 18th and 19th centuries, however these treaties are often vague or contradictory. After the founding of the People's Republic of China in 1949, Chinese government and Nepal government signed three border agreements signed in 1960, 1961, and 1963. A Joint Commission was created to define and demarcate the border.

Nepali opposition claim Nepal and China has an ongoing border dispute over the territory along the Himalayan border. However, both China and Nepal deny the accusation.

North Korea
China and North Korea share a 1,416 km long land border that corresponds almost entirely to the course of the Yalu and Tumen rivers. The two countries signed a border treaty in 1962 to resolve their un-demarcated land border. China received 40% of the disputed crater lake on Paektu Mountain (known as Changbai Mountain in China), while North Korea held the remaining land.

Pakistan
Two countries' border dispute is negotiated in 1950s. Sino-Pakistan Agreement (also known as the Sino-Pakistan Frontier Agreement and Sino-Pak Boundary Agreement) is a 1963 document between the governments of Pakistan and China establishing the border between those countries.

Russia
In 1991, China and USSR signed the 1991 Sino-Soviet Border Agreement, which intended to start the process of resolving the border disputes held in abeyance since the 1960s. However, just a few months later the USSR was dissolved, and four former Soviet republics — Russia, Kazakhstan, Kyrgyzstan, and Tajikistan — inherited various sections of the former Sino–Soviet border.

It took more than a decade for Russia and China to fully resolve the border issues and to demarcate the border. On May 29, 1994, during Russian Prime Minister Chernomyrdin's visit to Beijing, an "Agreement on the Sino-Russian Border Management System intended to facilitate border trade and hinder criminal activity" was signed. On September 3, a demarcation agreement was signed for the short western section of the binational border; the demarcation of this section was completed in 1998.

The last unresolved territorial issue between the two countries was settled by the 2004 Complementary Agreement between the People's Republic of China and the Russian Federation on the Eastern Section of the China–Russia Boundary. Pursuant to that agreement, Russia transferred to China a part of Abagaitu Islet, the entire Yinlong (Tarabarov) Island, about half of Bolshoy Ussuriysky Island, and some adjacent river islets. The transfer has been ratified by both the Chinese National People's Congress and the Russian State Duma in 2005, thus ending the decades-long border dispute. The official transfer ceremony was held on-site on October 14, 2008.

Tajikistan
China had a longstanding territorial claim on about 28,430 square kilometers (10.977 square miles) of Tajik territory since 1884, which was taken from the then Qing dynasty by unequal treaties.

In 2011, as part of a boundary agreement, China officially relinquished its claim on 96% of the total disputed territory, while Tajikistan ceded around 4% - about 1,137 square km (439 square miles) - to China. However, this treaty is not recognized by the Republic of China (ROC) government based in Taipei, and they continue to claim the territory (among others) as reflected in official government maps.

See also
 East China Sea EEZ disputes
Territorial disputes of Japan
 Foreign relations of China
 Territorial changes of the People's Republic of China
 Borders of China

References